Hannover Korbjäger is a German professional basketball team located in Hannover, Germany. The team currently competes in the Regionalliga.

The club is internationally known because some of its players have either represented their senior national teams (Ebanks) or were selected for All Star games in a 1st division European league (Dunovic, Rasmussen).

Notable players
To appear in this section a player must have either:
 Set a club record or won an individual award as a professional player.
 Played at least one official international match for his senior national team or one NBA game at any time.
 Jorge Ebanks

References

External links

Presentation at Eurobasket.com
Presentation at Facebook

Basketball teams established in 2006
Basketball clubs in Lower Saxony
Sport in Hanover